Danny Kadar (born August 15, 1969) is an American record producer, audio engineer, and mixer, living in New Orleans. While growing up in New York City, Kadar first began as a student photographer studying at Pratt Institute, he later decided to go into the music industry with his own band at the time. After being in the studio, Kadar would soon learn more about how to run the studio. With all the experience he has from producing, editing, and mixing, Kadar has been able to work with popular acts such as Band of Horses, My Morning Jacket, and Iggy Pop.

Selected discography
2011 - Fixin' to Die - G.Love
2010 - Infinite Arms - Band of Horses
2009 - Songs in the Night - Samantha Crain
2008 - Didn't It Feel Kinder - Amy Ray
2007 - What's the Time Mr Wolf? - Noisettes
2007 - Friend - Grizzly Bear
2007 - Emotionalism - The Avett Brothers
2003 - It Still Moves - My Morning Jacket
1996 - Sex, America, Cheap Trick - Cheap Trick
1996 - Don Solaris - 808 State

References

1969 births
Living people
American record producers
American people of Hungarian-Jewish descent